Dato’ Thiagarajan K.R. Arumugam (born 3 May 1950), known by his stage name David Arumugam, is a Malaysian musician and singer who is one of the founding members of the band called Alleycats. He is the elder brother of Loganathan Arumugam. On 12 February 2009, David Arumugam was conferred the Darjah Indera Mahkota Pahang (DIMP) award which carries the title of " Dato' " in conjunction with the Sultan of Pahang's 78th birthday on 24 October 2008.

Early life 
David and his brother Loga were exposed to music making through their mother, radio announcer and Carnatic classical singer, who would often brought them along to her performance sessions; particularly in town halls. Such experiences instilled a strong passion in him to play music at a very young age. He often played truant in school to do rehearsals with a band that he performed with his friends, and he eventually quit school at the age of 17 because "history and geography was not helping me in my music."

Honours 
  :
 Companion of the Order of Loyalty to the Crown of Malaysia (J.S.M.) (2008)
 :
  Knight Companion of the Order of the Crown of Pahang (D.I.M.P.) – Dato' (2008)

Discography

Filmography

Film

References

External links 
 

Companions of the Order of Loyalty to the Crown of Malaysia
Living people
People from Penang
Malaysian people of Indian descent
Malaysian male pop singers
Malaysian people of Tamil descent
Malay-language singers
1950 births
Malaysian funk singers
Malaysian pop rock singers